Cyron Bjørn Melville (born 1 July 1984) is a Danish actor and musician.

Early life 
Melville was born in Djursland, Denmark, to Scottish comedian Johnny Melville and Dane Elizabeth Bjørn Nielsen.

Career 

In Denmark, his fame was cemented after playing Oliver Schandorff in the Emmy-nominated local series The Killing. For his supporting role in Natasha Arthy's Fighter, Melville was nominated at the Bodil Awards 2008 and as Idol of the Year at the Boogie Awards. A year after he won the Shooting Stars Award at the Berlin International Film Festival.

In 2009, Melville received an award as Best Actor at the Marrakech International Film Festival and at the Montreal World Film Festival for his performance in Danish movie Love and Rage produced by Zentropa.

In 2012 Melville is Enevold Brandt in the historical drama A Royal Affair. In the same year he starred in music videos In Love with the World by Aura Dione and Tomgang by Shaka Loveless.

Recently he joined the cast of Showtime period drama The Borgias, created by Neil Jordan and renewed for a third season in 2013.

In addition to his career as actor, Melville is a musician. From 2002 to 2006 was a drummer in Danish reggae band .

Personal life 
Melville speaks Danish, English, Swedish and German.

Filmography

References

External links 
 Cyron Melville at www.shooting-stars.eu 
 

1984 births
Danish male actors
Danish people of Scottish descent
Living people